This is a list of mountains in Aragon, Spain. They include the Aneto, the highest peak in the Pyrenees, as well as the Moncayo, the highest peak in the Sistema Ibérico.

See also
List of Pyrenean three-thousanders
Pyrenees
Pre-Pyrenees
Iberian System
List of mountains in Catalonia
List of mountains in the Valencian Community

Further reading

References

External links 

Federación Aragonesa de Montañismo
Manifiesto por las montañas de Aragón: Alternativa Blanca
Plataforma en Defensa de las Montañas de Aragón
Jesus Pardina, Montañas de Aragón, 180 caminatas y ascensiones, 
Sierra de Layre
Lista de picos d'o Perineu aragonés
Catálogo de montes de utilidad pública

Aragon